Adil Sheikh (born 12 March 1975) is an Indian former cricketer. He played nine first-class matches for Bengal between 1992 and 1994.

See also
 List of Bengal cricketers

References

External links
 

1975 births
Living people
Indian cricketers
Bengal cricketers
Cricketers from Delhi